Josuikan Junior and Senior High School (如水館中学校・高等学校 Josuikan Chūgakkō Kōtōgakkō) is a combined private junior and senior high school in Mihara, Hiroshima Prefecture, Japan.

See also
 Josuikan Bangkok International School

References

External links
 Josuikan Junior and Senior High School
 Josuikan Junior and Senior High School 

Junior high schools in Japan
High schools in Hiroshima Prefecture
Schools in Hiroshima Prefecture